Ficimia publia (common name: blotched hooknose snake) is a species of colubrid snake, indigenous to southern Mexico (Yucatan, Jalisco, and Morelos), Belize, Guatemala, and Honduras.

Appearance
The blotched hooknose snake is so called because of its sharp-edged upturned snout. It is normally pale tan, pale brown, yellowish tan, orange-tan or reddish brown in colour.

Diet
The snake has a diet of mostly spiders and insects, and uses its characteristic 'hooked nose' to forage through the debris on the forest floor.

Defence
When scared or threatened the snake coils up and opens its mouth before striking. It is harmless and not poisonous, but it resembles the venomous variable coral snake, and this frightens predators away.

Notes

References
Campbell, J. Amphibians and Reptiles of Northern Guatemala, the Yucatán, and Belize.

Colubrids
Reptiles described in 1866
Reptiles of Mexico
Reptiles of Belize